Mädchen (German for girl) was the first studio album of the German rock/pop duo Lucilectric. The album spawned a namesake single that spent 12 weeks in the German Top 10, eventually reaching number two. Another single, Hey Süßer (hey sweetheart), reached number one in the Austrian charts. The album and both singles also charted in the Swiss and Dutch markets.

Track listing

All tracks written by van Org and Goldkind

Charts

Singles

Awards
 ECHO - Single of the Year for Mädchen (1995)

Info
A rare English version of the song, called "Girly Girl," was used in the film The NeverEnding Story III.

References

1994 albums
Lucilectric albums
Songs with feminist themes